The FIVB Beach Volleyball U19 World Championships (previously known as the FIVB Beach Volleyball SWATCH Youth World Championships) is a double-gender international beach volleyball tournament for athletes under the age of 19. The competition first took place in Xylokastro, Greece, in 2002. Prior to the 2005 edition, it was an under-18 tournament.

Results summary

Men

Notes:

Women

Notes:

Medals table

References

Recurring sporting events established in 2002
U19
Beach
World youth sports competitions
Youth volleyball